Kisra-Sumei is a local council in the western Galilee in the Northern District of Israel. In April 2019, 95% of the population were Israeli Arabs of the Druze community, with a small Christian minority. The town has a Druze holy place as well as a statue to the Druze leader and Syrian nationalist revolutionary Sultan al-Atrash.

The town is the result of a merger between the villages of Kisra and Sumei and it was recognised as a local council in 1990.

Climate
Kisra-Sumei has a mediterranean climate (Köppen climate classification: Csa).

See also
Arab localities in Israel
Druze in Israel

References

Bibliography

 
 (Kisra: 150, 185 Kafr Sumay': 148, 169 (=Guerin))
  (Dauphin pp. 637–8,  639)
 
 (Kesra: pp. 77-78; Kefr Semeia: p. 77)

(p. 192)
 
 (Kisra: “The fragment”; p.  51; Kefr Sumeia: “The village of Sumeiả”; p.  44)

 
 (p. 174,  191)
 (Strehlke, 1869, pp. 57-58, No. 73; cited in Röhricht, 1893, RRH p. 267, No. 1020; cited in  Frankel, 1988, p. 255)

External links
Welcome To Kafr Sumei
Welcome To Kisra-Sumei
Survey of Western Palestine, Map 3:  IAA, Wikimedia commons

Druze communities in Israel
Arab Christian communities in Israel
Local councils in Northern District (Israel)